Shelltown is the name of several places in the United States:

 Shelltown, San Diego, California, a neighborhood
 Shelltown, Maryland, an unincorporated community
 Shelltown, Pennsylvania, a census-designated place

See also
Snelltown, Maryland
Shellytown, Pennsylvania